Lamprosema biformis is a moth in the family Crambidae. It was described by Arthur Gardiner Butler in 1889. It is found in Taiwan.

References

Moths described in 1889
Lamprosema
Moths of Taiwan